"Night Witches" was a World War II German nickname for the all-female military aviators of the 588th Night Bomber Regiment, known later as the 46th "Taman" Guards Night Bomber Aviation Regiment, of the Soviet Air Forces. Though women were officially barred from combat at the time, Major Marina Raskova used her position and personal contacts with the Soviet leader Joseph Stalin to obtain permission to form female combat units. "Combat facilitated and ushered in a reluctant acceptance of women in military, based more upon practicality and necessity than for equality". On October 8, 1941, an order was issued to deploy three women's air-force units, including the 588th Regiment. The regiment, formed by Raskova and led by Major Yevdokiya Bershanskaya, was composed primarily of female volunteers in their late teens and early twenties.

An attack technique of the night bombers involved idling the engine near the target and gliding to the bomb-release point with only wind noise left to reveal their presence. German soldiers likened the sound to broomsticks and hence named the pilots "Night Witches". Due to the weight of the bombs and the low altitude of flight, the pilots did not carry parachutes until 1944.

When the regiment was deployed on the front line in June 1942, the 588th Night Bomber Regiment became part of the 4th Air Army of the Southern Front. In February 1943 the regiment was honored with the Guards designation and reorganized as the 46th Guards Night Bomber Aviation Regiment in the 325th Night Bomber Aviation Division, 4th Air Army, 2nd Belorussian Front; in October 1943 it became the 46th "Taman" Guards Night Bomber Aviation Regiment, "Taman" referring to the unit's involvement in the Novorossiysk-Taman operations on the Taman Peninsula during 1943.

Conception 
In October 1941, Major Marina Raskova was granted authority to select candidates for the 122nd Composite Air Group, an all-female aviation regiment. Raskova had already established several world records in long-distance non-stop flights and was referred to as the "Russian Amelia Earhart" for her achievements. When the Germans invaded in 1941, young women began writing Raskova letters, asking how they could best serve their country using their flight skills. Raskova used her personal connection with Stalin to obtain approval to establish the regiment.

Stalin was quick to approve of the initiative, as he had a general interest in the women's "tremendous international propaganda value."

History and tactics 
The regiment flew harassment and precision bombing missions against the German military from 1942 until the end of the Second World War (1945). At its largest, it had 40 two-person crews. The regiment flew over 23,000 sorties, dropping over 3,000 tons of bombs and 26,000 incendiary shells. It was the most highly decorated female unit in the Soviet Air Force, with many pilots having flown over 800 missions by the end of the war, and twenty-three having been awarded the Hero of the Soviet Union title. Thirty-two of its members died during the war.

The regiment flew in wood-and-canvas Polikarpov U-2 biplanes, a 1928 design intended for use as training aircraft (hence its original uchebnyy designation prefix of "U-") and for crop dusting, which also had a special U-2LNB version for the sort of night harassment attack missions flown by the 588th. The plane could only carry  of bombs, so eight or more missions per night were often necessary. Although the aircraft was obsolete and slow, the pilots took advantage of its exceptional maneuverability; it also had a maximum speed that was lower than the stalling speed of both the Messerschmitt Bf 109 and the Focke-Wulf Fw 190, which made it very difficult for German pilots to shoot down, with the exception of fighter ace Josef Kociok, who grounded the regiment for an entire night by shooting down three or four of their planes on the night of 31 July  1 August 1943.

Original reception 
Initially, this all-female aviation regiment was not welcomed into the military with open arms. Many of their male counterparts saw them as inferior and treated them with lack of respect. The women of the regiment were also given hand-me-downs of uniforms and over-sized shoes by the men, as well as rudimentary tools (such as rulers, flashlights and pencils) that lacked the "luxury" that the male soldiers received with their tools (for example, radar, guns and radios).

Timeline and operations 
Members of the regiment were deployed from the Engels Military Aviation School to the Southern Front as part of the 218th Division of the 4th Air Army on 23 May 1942, where they arrived on 27 May.

 12 June 1942: The regiment's baptism by fire took place on the Southern front in bombings of river crossings on the Mius, Severny Donets, and Don rivers as well as roads in the Sal steppes and Stavropol suburbs.
 August–December 1942: In the Battle of the Caucasus, the regiment defended the city of Vladikavkaz as well as bombing enemy equipment and troops in Digora, Mozdok, and Prokhladnaya.
 January 1943: Assisted in the breakthrough of enemy defensive lines on the Terek River as well as offensive operations against ground troops in the Kuban River valley and Stavropol.
 March – September 1943: Assisted in the breakthrough of the Kuban bridgehead and the liberation of Novorossiysk.
 April – July 1943: Participated in an aerial campaign over Kuban.
 November 1943 – May 1944: Provided air support to ground troops in the Kerch–Eltigen Operation as part of the Crimean Offensive and in the city of Sevastopol.
 June–July 1944: Bombed enemy fortifications along the Pronya River, helping to take control of Białystok, Cherven, Minsk, and Mogilev in Byelorussia.
 August 1944: Operations over Poland in campaigns to expel the Germans from the cities of Augustów, Warsaw, and Ostrołęka.
 January 1945: Participated in the East Prussian Offensive.
 March 1945: Participated in offensives over Gdynia and Gdansk.
 April – May 1945: Assisted in the Vistula–Oder Offensive.
 15 October 1945: The regiment was disbanded following the end of the war and service members were demobilized.

Sorties/Missions 
Throughout the course of the war the regiment accumulated approximately 23,672 sorties in combat, including in the following battles:
 Battle of the Caucasus – 2,920 sorties
 Kuban, Taman, Novorossiysk – 4,623 sorties
 Crimean Offensive – 6,140 sorties
 Belarus Offensive – 400 sorties
 Poland Offensive – 5,421 sorties
 German Offensive – 2,000 sorties

In total the regiment collectively accumulated 28,676 flight hours, dropped over 3,000 tons of bombs and over 26,000 incendiary shells, damaging or completely destroying 17 river crossings, nine railways, two railway stations, 26 warehouses, 12 fuel depots, 176 armored cars, 86 firing points, and 11 searchlights. In addition to bombings, the unit performed 155 supply drops of food and ammunition to Soviet forces.

Personnel 

In total, 261 people served in the regiment, of whom 32 died of various causes during the war including plane crashes, combat deaths and tuberculosis. Twenty-eight aircraft were written off.

Leadership 
 Yevdokiya Bershanskaya – regiment commander
 Serafima Amosova – deputy regiment commander
 Yevdokiya Rachkevich – commissar
 Maria Fortus and later Irina Rakobolskaya – chief of staff
 Valentina Stupina and later Khiuaz Dospanova – head of communications

Longstanding effects

Disciplined personnel 
Senior Engineer Sofiya Ozerkova destroyed her party card to avoid being seized after she was shot down and had to escape and evade from the German Army. Following her return to the Regiment she was sentenced to death by a military tribunal in 1942 because she could not produce the card. She was later acquitted after her sentence was suspended and she was reinstated to her position. Mechanics Raisa Kharitonova and Tamara Frolova were sentenced to ten years of imprisonment for dismantling a flare (used by navigators to illuminate bombing targets) and using the small silk parachutes to sew undergarments. Both of them were retrained as navigators, but Frolova was killed in action in 1943.

Honored personnel 
Twenty-three personnel from the regiment were awarded the title Hero of the Soviet Union, two were awarded Hero of the Russian Federation, and one was awarded Hero of Kazakhstan.

Heroes of the Soviet Union

 Raisa Aronova
 Vera Belik
 Marina Chechneva
 Rufina Gasheva
 Polina Gelman
 Tatyana Makarova
 Natalya Meklin
 Yevdokiya Nikulina
 Yevdokiya Nosal
 Olga Sanfirova
 Zoya Parfenova
 Yevdokia Pasko
 Nadezhda Popova
 Nina Raspopova
 Yevgeniya Rudneva
 Yekaterina Ryabova
 Irina Sebrova
 Mariya Smirnova
 Maguba Syrtlanova
 Nina Ulyanenko
 Yevgeniya Zhigulenko

Heroes of the Russian Federation
 Aleksandra Akimova
 Tatyana Sumarokova

Hero of Kazakhstan
 Khiuaz Dospanova

Post-War life 
In 1917, Russia was the first country to declare legal equality for women, which allowed them to enter military service. Women were inherently equal in both rights and responsibilities as a Russian citizen as social equality was a fundamental part of the Communist ideology. However, ideology was not always exhibited in practice which is seen time and time again especially through times of war whether it be prior, during, or after. In the case of after World War II, women in Russia were treated as though they always have been, especially before the 1917 law was passed. Many can see this passing as a way to get more nationalistic views for Russia, along with soldiers to fight for their country, rather than for the actual equality and treatment of women. A common dilemma for these women grew out of the social pressures of deciding to place more importance on the family instead of an aviation or military career. Irina Rakobolskaya, pilot with the 588th Regiment, rationalized the difficult reality and challenges she faced to pursue both a family and piloting career when she stated, “I think that during the war, when the fate of our country was being decided, the bringing in of women into aviation was justified. But in peacetime a woman can only fly for sport...otherwise how can one combine a career with a family and with maternal happiness?”

Other women's regiments 
On 8 October 1941, Order number 0099 specified the creation of three women's regiments—all personnel from technicians to pilots would be entirely composed of women. The other two regiments were the 586th Fighter Aviation Regiment, which used Yak-1 fighters, and the 587th Bomber Aviation Regiment, which used twin engine Pe-2 dive bombers. Later the unit received the Guards designation and reorganized as the 125th Guards Bomber Aviation Regiment. Although all three regiments had been planned to have women exclusively, none remained all-female. The 586th and 588th Regiments employed male mechanics, the 586th because no women had received training to work on the Yakovlev fighter planes before the war. The 586th's woman commander, Major Tamara Aleksandrovna Kazarinova, was replaced by a man, Major Aleksandr Vasilievich Gridnev, in October 1942. The 587th Regiment was originally under the command of Marina Raskova, but after her death in 1943, a male commanding officer, Major Valentin Markov, replaced her. The 587th's Petlyakov Pe-2 dive bombers also required a tall person to operate the top rear machine gun, but not enough women recruited were tall enough, requiring some men to join the aircrews as radio operator and tail gunner. The 588th Regiment's staff driver and searchlight operatives were also male.

See also 

 Luftwaffen-Legion Lettland, a German night harassment unit on the Eastern Front during the war (outside of the usual Störkampfstaffel squadrons and Nachtschlachtgruppe groups for such duties)
 Washing Machine Charlie, the term for Japanese night harassment aircraft during the Guadalcanal Campaign and later
 1077th Anti-Aircraft Regiment, a Soviet regiment that fought in the Battle of Stalingrad composed predominantly of young female volunteers

References

Bibliography

External links
Retropod podcast
Stuff You Missed in History Class podcast
The Night Witches of World War Two at BBC World Service

All-female military units and formations
Air units and formations of the Soviet Union in World War II
Regiments of the Soviet Air Forces
Bomber aviation units and formations of the Soviet Air Forces